Rye Barcott is a social entrepreneur, investor, and the author of the memoir It Happened on the Way to War. He co-founded Carolina for Kibera, Double Time Capital, and With Honor.

Biography

Early life and education 
Barcott's mother, Donna Schwartz-Barcott, is a nurse and anthropologist who teaches at the University of Rhode Island. His father, T.P. Schwartz-Barcott, attended Miami University on a Reserve Officers' Training Corps scholarship and went on to serve in the Marines' 3rd Reconnaissance Battalion during the Vietnam War. His father left the Marines as a captain after receiving a Bronze Star Medal with a valor device and a Purple Heart. His parents met as graduate students at the University of North Carolina at Chapel Hill.

Barcott attended East Greenwich High School. He graduated in 2001 Phi Beta Kappa from the University of North Carolina at Chapel Hill. He attended UNC on a four-year U.S. Marine Corps NROTC Scholarship. Barcott graduated in 2009 with an MPA and MBA from Harvard University, where he was a Center for Public Leadership Social Entrepreneurship Fellow and George Leadership Fellow. Harvard University President Drew Faust appointed him to a two-year term on the Harvard Endowment's Advisory Committee on Shareholder Responsibility, and he served as a founding member of the movement to create an MBA Oath. He was elected as a member of the Harvard University Alumni Association Board of Directors in 2016.

Career

Military service 
Barcott served five years on active duty in the Marine Corps, where he attained the rank of captain and deployed to Bosnia, the Horn of Africa, and Iraq. In 2006, he provided written testimony to the Iraq Study Group and authored an article about the Iraqi Military Intelligence Academy in Proceedings, the professional journal of the U.S. Navy.  ABC World News with Charles Gibson covered his work in Kibera and his military service in Iraq and named him a Person of the Week and a 2006 Person of the Year.  The ABC World News story quoted him encouraging young Americans to expose themselves "to how the majority of the world lives … and I think it'll make you a lot more appreciative of what you've got … make you a better American and a better global citizen."

Social enterprises 
While an undergraduate at the UNC in 2001, Barcott founded Carolina for Kibera (CFK) in Kenya with Salim Mohamed and Tabitha Atieno Festo. CFK started as a small inter-ethnic soccer program and medical clinic run out of Festo's ten-by-ten foot shack. Today it is an affiliated entity of the University of North Carolina at Chapel Hill.  Barcott is the Chair of the Board of CFK. CFK's Advisory Council includes former U.S. Secretary of State Madeleine Albright, former CDC Director Dr. William Roper and the former CEO of the Kenya Medical Association Stellah Bosire.

Barcott co-founded With Honor in 2017 with David Gergen and other veterans. With Honor is a cross-partisan movement led by veterans focused on promoting and advancing principled veteran leadership in order to reduce polarization. With Honor Action's advisory board includes post-9/11 veterans, Gold Star family members, and other prominent American public figures.

Investing 
Barcott and Dan McCready co-founded Double Time Capital in 2013 as an impact investment firm focused on clean energy and sustainability. As of February 2017, "Double Time has financed 36 solar energy projects, which collectively produce roughly 10% of North Carolina's solar power and power around 30,000 homes in the state." At that time, North Carolina was the second ranked state in the United States based on the cumulative amount of solar electric capacity installed. Double Time Capital also invested in growth-oriented companies with sustainable products and services.

Prior to forming Double Time Capital, Barcott worked as a Special Advisor to the CEO and Chairman of Duke Energy, Jim Rogers. Barcott formed and led an investment team for the CEO that focused on renewable energy and disruptive growth opportunities.

Public speaking 
Barcott delivered the 2007 commencement address to the University of North Carolina at Chapel Hill School of Public Health.  He was the 2018 commencement speaker for the University of North Carolina at Chapel Hill. As an inaugural TED Fellow, he gave a TED speech on "The Power of Participatory Development."  He is an annual speaker at the U.S. Marine Corps Battles Won Academy for Semper Fidelis high school student All-Americans. He is represented by the American Program Bureau and frequently speaks at colleges and high schools.

Boards 
Barcott serves on the Boards of the National Veterans Memorial and Museum, National Democratic Institute, Veterans Bridge Home, The U.S. Institute for Peace, and the Global War on Terrorism Memorial Foundation. He previously served on the board of the international development organization World Learning and its accredited institution the School for International Training, and returned to that board in October 2020.

President Barack Obama appointed Barcott to the J. William Fulbright Foreign Scholarship Board as a representative of the veteran community.

Published work  
Barcott is the author of the memoir It Happened on the Way to War (Bloomsbury Publishing). The book's dedication to Carolina For Kibera cofounders Salim Mohamed and Tabitha Atieno Festo includes a phrase that captures the central theme of the book: "Talent is universal; opportunity is not."

In 2001, Barcott co-edited with Dr. Carolyn Pumphrey Armed Conflict in Africa, a book that analyzed the sources of violence in Africa. His post-9/11 letters with Salim Mohamed were published in Andrew Carroll's War Letters: Extraordinary Correspondence from American Wars (Scribner, 2001). He contributed to Passion and Purpose, 27 Views of Charlotte, and 65 Successful Harvard Business School Application Essays. His writing has appeared in The Washington Post, The New York Times, and TIME.

It Happened on the Way to War was one of four books selected for the TED 2011 Book Club, and was named best nonfiction title in 2011 by the North Carolina Literary and Historical Association. In 2011, Reader's Digest named the book as one of four top nonfiction titles of the year.

Honors 
The U.S. Department of Defense awarded Barcott with the Military Outstanding Volunteer Service Medal.

ABC World News named him a Person of the Year.

The World Economic Forum named him a Young Global Leader.

Harvard Business School presented Barcott and his classmates Alex Ellis, Neil Wagle, and Kate Wattson with the Dean’s Award for Service to the School and Society.

Dartmouth College awarded him a Doctorate of Humane Letters in 2016.

Voices for National Service awarded him with the 2022 National Service Advocate of the Year award for "exemplary determination, creativity, and results in building support for national service among our nation’s leaders."

Personal life 
He is the husband of  Dr. Tracy Barcott, a child psychologist. They live in North Carolina and have three children.

References

External links

Carolina for Kibera
Harvard Profile
It Happened on the Way to War

ABC World News Person of the Year
FOX News Power Player of the Week
Morning Joe interview
FOX News profile
Jim Fallows Atlantic Monthly Book Review
David Brooks NYT column “The Rugged Altruists” 

1979 births
Living people
American humanitarians
American male non-fiction writers
American memoirists
American expatriates in Kenya
United States Marine Corps personnel of the Iraq War
Harvard Business School alumni
Social entrepreneurs
21st-century American businesspeople
United States Marine Corps officers
University of North Carolina at Chapel Hill alumni
Harvard Kennedy School alumni
American military writers
American chief executives
People from Rhode Island
People from Charlotte, North Carolina
American investors
Renewable energy commercialization
Businesspeople from Charlotte, North Carolina